Davara is a genus of snout moths. It was described by Francis Walker in 1859 and is known from Puerto Rico.

Species
 Davara azonaxsalis Walker, 1859
 Davara caricae (Dyar, 1913)
 Davara rufulella (Ragonot, 1889)

References

Phycitinae
Pyralidae genera